Francis Allyn Olmsted (14 July 1819, in Chapel Hill, North Carolina – 19 July 1844, in New Haven, Connecticut) was an American author.

Biography
He was a son of physicist Denison Olmsted. He graduated from Yale in 1839. He made a sea voyage to the Sandwich Islands for his health, on the barque North America in 1839 and 1840, and after his return he graduated from the medical department of Yale in 1844.

He wrote Incidents of a Whaling Voyage, published in 1841 at New York City by D. Appleton and Co., the publishers of Appletons' Cyclopædia of American Biography. The voyage was from New London, Connecticut and took in the Azores, Cape Horn, Hawaii, Tahiti as well as the Sandwich Islands, before returning to Sandy Hook.

References

External links

 Full text of Incidents of a Whaling Voyage  - subtitled: "To which are added observations on the scenery, manners and customs, and missionary stations of the Sandwich and Society Islands, accompanied by numerous lithographic prints."

1819 births
1844 deaths
People from Chapel Hill, North Carolina
Yale University alumni
American male writers